Platystolus is a genus of European bush crickets in the tribe Ephippigerini, first described by Ignacio Bolívar in 1878.  To date (2022), species have only been recorded from France and the Iberian peninsula.

Species 
The Orthoptera Species File lists:
 Platystolus martinezii (Bolívar, 1873)
 Platystolus surcularius (Bolívar, 1877) - type species (as Ephippiger surcularius Bolívar)

Note: other species have been included in this genus, but may be misplaced.

References

External links 
 Images at iNaturalist
 
 

Orthoptera of Europe
Ensifera genera
Bradyporinae